Business informatics (BI) is a discipline combining economics, economics of digitization, business administration, information technology (IT), and concepts of computer science. Business informatics centers around creating programming and equipment frameworks which ultimately provides the organization with effective operation based on information technology application. The focus on programming and equipment boosts the value to the analysis of economics and information technology. The BI discipline was created in Germany (in German: Wirtschaftsinformatik). It is an established academic discipline including bachelor, master, diploma and PhD programs in Austria, Belgium, France, Germany, Hungary, Ireland, The Netherlands, Russia, Slovakia, Sweden, Switzerland, Turkey and is establishing in an increasing number of other countries as well as Finland, Australia, Bosnia and Herzegovina, Malaysia, Mexico, Poland and India.

Business informatics as an integrative discipline
BI shows similarities to information systems (IS), which is a well-established discipline originating from North America. However, there are a few differences that make business informatics a unique own discipline:
 Business informatics includes information technology, like the relevant portions of applied computer science, to a larger extent than information systems do.
 Business informatics includes significant construction and implementation-oriented elements. I.e. one major focus lies in the development of solutions for business problems rather than the ex post investigation of their impact.

Information systems (IS) focuses on empirically explaining the phenomena of the real world. IS has been said to have an "explanation-oriented" focus in contrast to the "solution-oriented" focus that dominates BI. IS researchers make an effort to explain the phenomena of acceptance and influence of IT in organizations and the society applying an empirical approach. In order to do that usually qualitative and quantitative empirical studies are conducted and evaluated. In contrast to that, BI researchers mainly focus on the creation of IT solutions for challenges they have observed or assumed and thereby they focus more on the possible future uses of IT.

Tight integration between research and teaching following the Humboldtian ideal is another goal in business informatics. Insights gained in actual research projects become part of the curricula quite fast since most researchers are also lecturers at the same time. The pace of scientific and technological progress in BI is quite rapid, therefore subjects taught are under permanent reconsideration and revision. In its evolution, the BI discipline is fairly young. Therefore, significant hurdles have to be overcome in order to further establish its vision.

Career prospects 
Specialists in Business Informatics can work both in research and in commerce. In business, there are various uses, which may vary depending on professional experience. Fields of employment may include:

 Consulting
 (Information) System Development
 Sales
 Systems Analysis and Organization

In consulting, a clear line must be drawn between strategic as well as IT consulting.

Journal 
Business & Information Systems Engineering

See also
 Master of Business Informatics

References

Academic disciplines
Information systems
Information technology management